Victor Ciorbea (born on 26 October 1954) is a Romanian jurist, politician, and civil/public servant. He was the Mayor of Bucharest between 1996 and 1997 and, after his resignation from this public dignity/position, Prime Minister of Romania from 12 December 1996 to 30 March 1998. He had also served as the Ombudsman between 2014 and 2019.

Biography

Born in Ponor, Alba County on 26 October 1954, Ciorbea trained as a jurist,  graduating from Babeș-Bolyai University in Cluj-Napoca in 1979. He worked for the municipal tribunal in Bucharest, as well as lecturing in Law at the University of Bucharest. He was awarded a doctorate in Law by the University of Bucharest, and later specialized in management at Case Western Reserve University in the United States (1992).

Originally a trade unionist (between 1990 and 1996, he was leader of the Federation of Free Trade Unions in Education, FSLI, and, between 1990 and 1993, leader of the nationwide National Confederation of Free Trade Unions of Romania – Brotherhood) and member of the National Peasants' Party (PNȚ-CD). He was backed for the premiership by the Romanian Democratic Convention (CDR) after the elections of 1996. Ciorbea enforced several measures in order to advance Romania's transition toward a market economy, including an austerity budget, following a program known as Contractul cu România ("Contract with Romania").

He resigned following a conflict with PNȚ-CD leader Ion Diaconescu, moving on to found the minor Alianța Natională Creștin Democrată (the National Christian Democratic Alliance, ANCD), which merged back into the PNȚ-CD after the latter lost the 2000 elections, and soon after became leader of the reunited party.

Faced with the task of regaining voter confidence, Ciorbea resigned his party office in 2004, in favour of Gheorghe Ciuhandu, the Mayor of Timișoara. Following the latter's nomination, the party became the Christian Democratic National Peasants' Party (PNȚ-CD).

In 2012, as a member of National Liberal Party (PNL), he was elected as senator. In April 2014, without the support of his own party colleagues, but with the help of the ruling PSD, he became Ombudsman.

Honours

National honours
  Romanian Royal Family: Knight of the Royal Decoration of Nihil Sine Deo

Electoral history

Mayor of Bucharest

References

  GUVERNUL VICTOR CIORBEA, AGERPRES
  Victor Ciorbea's website
 http://romaniacurata.ro/ciorbea-englezii-beau-ceai-si-au-pisici-afla-ce-legatura-exista-intre-declaratie-si-legea-educatiei-contacteaza-l-si-tu-pe-avocatul-poporului/

See also
 List of Case Western people

Prime Ministers of Romania
Mayors of Bucharest
Leaders of political parties in Romania
Ombudspersons in Romania
Romanian jurists
Romanian trade union leaders
People from Alba County
Babeș-Bolyai University alumni
Academic staff of the University of Bucharest
1954 births
Living people
Christian Democratic National Peasants' Party politicians
National Liberal Party (Romania) politicians
University of Bucharest alumni
Case Western Reserve University people